Yanks is a 1979 drama film directed by John Schlesinger, and starring Richard Gere, Vanessa Redgrave, William Devane, Lisa Eichhorn and Tony Melody. The film is set during the Second World War in Northern England and features no combat scenes.

The film depicts the relationships between American soldiers stationed in semi-rural England and the local population during the build-up to Operation Overlord in 1944. In particular, three romances between US service personnel and local women are shown, in order to explore the effects of the cultural differences between the brash GIs or "Yanks" and the more reserved British population.

The World Premier was held June 1, 1979 at a theater in Bournemouth, England.  Lisa Eichhorn was present at the premier which had invited returning D-Day veterans from many American divisions - most notably the American 29th Division.  Leader of the returning 29ers was Sgt Curtis C. Williams who was 19 on D-Day.

Plot
A small northern town soon finds out that a large U.S. Army base is being established for the build-up to the Normandy landings. Soon thousands of rambunctious American troops, or "Yanks" as they are known to the British, descend upon the area. On leave in the town, Technical Sergeant Matt Dyson, encounters Jean Moreton while out to the cinema. She is the fiancée of Ken, a British soldier fighting overseas, and initially rebuffs Matt's advances. He is quite persistent, and she, doubtful about her relationship with Ken, eventually accepts him. The handsome, brash American is in stark contrast to the restrained Englishmen she has known. Soon, she is keeping company with Matt, though it is largely platonic at first.

For her part, Helen is a bit more worldly in her affairs. Captain John comes to her estate often, and a relationship develops. They are both married, but her husband is away at sea, and his wife is thousands of miles distant.

Eventually, the kind-hearted Matt Dyson is accepted by the Moreton family, notwithstanding Jean's engagement. They welcome his visits, when he, as an army cook, often brings hard-to-find foods normally on wartime rationing and other presents. But when news of Ken's death in action arrives, Jean's ailing mother condemns their relationship as a kind of betrayal.

Jean and Matt travel together to a Welsh seaside resort, where they make love but without completion when Matt realizes the uncertainty of the future. Jean is crushed, although Matt says "not like this." She feels spurned, and that her willingness to risk everything has not been matched by him, concluding that he is "not ready" for her.

Shortly afterwards, the Americans ship out by troop train to Southern England to prepare for D-Day. A characteristic last-minute gift and message from Matt prompt Jean into racing to the railway station. With the town and station a hive of activity, hundreds of the townswomen, some of them pregnant from liaisons with men they may never see again, scramble to catch one last glimpse of their American boyfriends before the train leaves. Matt shouts from the departing train that he will return.

Cast

 Richard Gere as Technical Sergeant Matt Dyson
 Lisa Eichhorn as Jean Moreton
 Vanessa Redgrave as Helen
 William Devane as Captain John
 Chick Vennera as Sergeant Danny Ruffelo
 Wendy Morgan as Mollie
 Rachel Roberts as Mrs. Clarrie Moreton
 Arlen Dean Snyder as Henry
 Annie Ross as Red Cross Lady
 Tony Melody as Mr. Jim Moreton
 Derek Thompson as Ken
 Joe Gladwin as Plumber at camp

Production
Schlesinger was able to obtain the finance to make Yanks - which was a personal project - because of the financial success of his 1976 suspense film Marathon Man.

Much of the filming took place on location in Northern England between April and August 1978. Scenes were shot on location in Oldham, Glossop, Stalybridge, Stockport, Salford and other surrounding areas. The opening shot of the film is the war memorial in Stalybridge town centre. Other scenes were filmed at the town hall in Hyde and outside a pillbox attached to a former Royal Ordnance Factory in Steeton, West Yorkshire. The main street procession was filmed in the Ordsall area of Salford, where the entire length of Regent Road was redressed to period appearance. All the shop fronts were replaced or covered over and the road-lines were covered by gravel. The cinema sequences, however, were shot at the Davenport Theatre / Cinema, in Stockport. This was chosen because of its authentic, period Art Deco interior, as well as the presence, in the orchestra pit, of a Compton 3 Manual/6 Rank theatre organ on a lift to the left of the stage. This was used in the film for scenes involving an audience sing-along, to such songs as "Praise the Lord and Pass the Ammunition" and "Deep in the Heart of Texas," Exterior shots of the unnamed Welsh resort were filmed along Happy Valley Road, Llandudno, North Wales.

The ending, where the troops board their train to head to the front, were filmed at Keighley railway station on the line belonging to the Keighley and Worth Valley Railway. An authentic Second World War locomotive, which is preserved by the heritage railway, was used for the scene.

Lisa Eichhorn said one of her most difficult scenes in the film was where she offers herself to her boyfriend, Matt, only to be rejected. "The difficult part was dealing with the nudity in that scene," she said. "I'd never done any on the stage, and didn't think I'd have to do it in my first movie. I didn't want to get the reputation of an actress who easily disrobes."

Reception
The film was a box office flop in the US only making $1.6 million in rentals.

The film received mixed reviews. On Rotten Tomatoes it has an approval rating of 57% based on reviews from 21 critics.

References

External links
 
 
 
 
 

1979 films
1979 romantic drama films
1970s war drama films
American romantic drama films
American war drama films
British romantic drama films
British war drama films
West German films
English-language German films
War romance films
Films directed by John Schlesinger
Films scored by Richard Rodney Bennett
Films set in the Metropolitan Borough of Oldham
Films set on the home front during World War II
Films with screenplays by Walter Bernstein
Films shot in Greater Manchester
Universal Pictures films
1970s English-language films
1970s American films
1970s British films